Hamilton is a town in Martin County, North Carolina, United States. The population was 408 at the 2010 census.

Geography
Hamilton is located at  (35.944116, -77.207772).

It is located on the Roanoke River at the 60 Mile Mark.

Demographics

As of the census of 2000, there were 516 people, 191 households, and 145 families residing in the town. The population density was 1,070.0 people per square mile (415.1/km2). There were 216 housing units at an average density of 447.9 per square mile (173.7/km2). The racial makeup of the town was 44.38% White, 53.29% African American, 0.19% Pacific Islander, 1.55% from other races, and 0.58% from two or more races. Hispanic or Latino of any race were 3.49% of the population.

There were 191 households, out of which 34.0% had children under the age of 18 living with them, 52.4% were married couples living together, 20.9% had a female householder with no husband present, and 23.6% were non-families. 22.5% of all households were made up of individuals, and 8.4% had someone living alone who was 65 years of age or older. The average household size was 2.57 and the average family size was 2.98.

In the town, the population was spread out, with 25.2% under the age of 18, 5.6% from 18 to 24, 23.4% from 25 to 44, 27.7% from 45 to 64, and 18.0% who were 65 years of age or older. The median age was 42 years. For every 100 females, there were 81.7 males. For every 100 females age 18 and over, there were 72.3 males.

The median income for a household in the town was $23,625, and the median income for a family was $28,977. Males had a median income of $27,500 versus $16,563 for females. The per capita income for the town was $12,832. About 18.2% of families and 24.1% of the population were below the poverty line, including 32.8% of those under age 18 and 43.4% of those age 65 or over.

History
The town was founded in 1804 on the highest point of the Roanoke River.

The most significant historical event of early Hamilton was the battle and fall of Fort Branch, when Union vessels and troops came upriver from Plymouth (see Plymouth, North Carolina History) in an attempt to reach Weldon to cut off supplies to General Robert E. Lee during the Civil War.  The fort protected Weldon until the day after the General Lee surrendered at Appomattox Court House, whereupon the railroad line over the Weldon bridge had no more military significance.  Afterwards, the fort was abandoned and the cannons were dumped into the Roanoke River by departing Confederate troops, and were only recently discovered. In July 1972, a group of men from Alabama came and began pulling cannons from the  river. The group was accused of violating North Carolina's antiquities laws in an effort to keep the cannons in Martin County. The courts officially decided that the cannons belong to the state under the North Carolina Department of Archives and History. The department decided to permanently loan the artifact to Fort Branch.

The Historic Hamilton Commission, started in 1976, is in charge of 52 other historic sites in the county, including St. Martin's Episcopal Church. The church was established as a missionary station of the Episcopalian church in 1868. It was founded primarily by members of the Boyle family, such as Francis Atherton Boyle and Mary A. Boyle. St. Martin's was admitted to the Episcopal convention in 1873. Building began in 1879. All of the construction materials were from local suppliers, except the bell and stained glass, which were imported from Wales. The church was consecrated on 17 May 1882. The Rev. Dr. Watson preached the sermon; Bishop Lyman celebrated Holy Communion. The church is now inactive, but is still owned by the Episcopal Diocese of East Carolina. This means it is still a consecrated church.

Another important site in Hamilton is the Rosenwald School. A black school funded by Julius Rosenwald, president of Sears, Roebuck and Co.,. During segregation, white schools had approximately five times the funding of the former. The Rosenwald Fund sought to provide support for these underprivileged schools. According to the Roanoke River Partners, The Rosenwald school will be remodeled and used as their headquarters. Hamilton is in the exact middle of the Roanoke River, making it a sensible location. Despite this, and years of taxpayer funding of the Roanoke River Partners, no concrete action has been taken to restore the building which is currently dilapidated.

Hamilton, once a thriving, beautiful Victorian port town with many of its homes listed in the National Historic Registry, had been in decline in recent years.

References

Towns in Martin County, North Carolina
Towns in North Carolina
Populated places established in 1804